Kalabari is an Ijo language of Nigeria spoken in Rivers State and Bayelsa State by the Awome people. Its three dialects are mutually intelligible. The Kalabari dialect (Kalabari proper) is one of the best-documented varieties of Ijo, and as such is frequently used as the prime example of Ijo in linguistic literature.

As of 2005, the language, "spoken by 258,000 people, [was] endangered largely because of the massive relocation that has taken place in the area due to the development of Nigeria's oil industry in the Port Harcourt region."

The Kalabari language became the basis of Berbice, a Dutch Creole spoken in Eastern Guyana.

Kalabari-language words have been proposed for some modern technical terms.

Dialects
Kalabari is spoken south of Port Harcourt.

Ibani is spoken southeast of Port Harcourt, in the Bonny local government area and in Opobo.

Kirike is spoken in Port Harcourt and the local government areas of Okrika and Ogu–Bolo.

Writing system

See also
Defaka word list (Wiktionary)

References

External links 
Kalabari - English Dictionary

Languages of Nigeria
Ijoid languages
Indigenous languages of Rivers State